Rodney Joffe is a South African/American entrepreneur and cybersecurity expert. He is a recipient of the FBI's Director's Award for Outstanding Cyber Investigation for his role in uncovering the Mariposa botnet.

Early life
Joffe was born in South Africa. He has been involved in information technology since 1973, when he trained as a systems analyst and programmer in the pensions actuarial group of the Old Mutual Life Insurance Company in Cape Town.

Career
Joffe is credited with creating web site hosting company Genuity (Internet company), as well as UltraDNS, a domain name service company which was sold to Neustar in 2006. He retired from Neustar in September, 2021.

From 2009-2010, Joffe was Director of the Conficker Working Group.

Durham inquiry

On September 15, 2021, Internet researchers successfully extrapolated information from civil litigation brought by Alfa Bank and other open source data to identify Joffe as "Max" from Dexter Filkins' New Yorker articles about Alfa-Bank and The Trump Organization, in addition to being a client of Michael  Sussmann.

On September 30, 2021, Joffe was confirmed to be Tech Executive-1.

In a February 2022 court motion related to Michael Sussmann's prosecution, Durham alleged that Joffe and his associates had exploited access his company had through a pending cybersecurity contract with the Executive Office of the President (EOP) to acquire nonpublic government domain name system and other data traffic "for the purpose of gathering derogatory information about Donald Trump." On March 4, 2022, Special counsel John Durham dropped these claims against Joffe.

Durham also did not allege that any eavesdropping of Trump communications content occurred. A spokesman for Joffe said his client had lawful access under a contract to analyze White House DNS data for potential security threats. The spokesman asserted Joffe's work was in response to hacks of the EOP in 2015 and of the DNC in 2016, as well as Russian YotaPhone queries in proximity to the EOP and the Trump campaign, that raised "serious and legitimate national security concerns about Russian attempts to infiltrate the 2016 election". Concerned cybersecurity researchers prepared a report "about the anomalies they found in the data" and shared it with the CIA.

Awards
In 2013, Joffe received the FBI's Director's Award for Outstanding Cyber Investigation for his role in uncovering the Mariposa botnet.

In 2015, Joffe received the Mary Litynski Lifetime Achievement Award from M3AAWG, for his lifetime work in fighting text spam, malware and DDoS attacks.

In 2018, Joffe received the Contribution to Cyber Security Award, presented at the 2018 Computing Security Awards. 

Three years in a row from 2018-2020, Joffe was  named Cybersecurity Professional of the Year, at the Cybersecurity Excellence Awards.

Patents
 Distributed computing system and method for distributing user requests to replicated network servers - Hopscotch - US 8,683,075 
 
 Domain name system and method of operating using restricted channels - US 9,871,794 
 
 Domain name system and method of operating using restricted channels - US 10,356,097 
 
 Method And System For Detecting Network Compromise - US 9,356,942 
 
 Method And System For Detecting Network Compromise - Continuation - US 9,674,222 
 
 Method and apparatus for balancing the process load on network servers according to network and serve based policies - US 6,185,619 
 
 Method and system for detecting network compromise - US 10,230,761 
 
 Multi-tenant unit - US 6,144,638 
 
 Secure Domain Name System - US 9,648,004 
 
 Secure Domain Name System - US 9,172,713

References

1954 births
Living people
American people of South African-Jewish descent
South African emigrants to the United States
20th-century American businesspeople
21st-century American businesspeople